Patrizia Sanvitale (born 9 October 1951 in Trieste) is an Italian journalist, author, blogger and sociologist. She graduated in Political Science at the University of Trieste.

Awards
She won the Eurochocolate Prize for Best Book of Chocolate (Il cioccolataio) in 2005.

Works 
 Ho sognato California, Rizzoli, Milan, 2001;
 Il tipografo, il Saggiatore, Milan, 2004;
 Il cioccolataio, il Saggiatore, Milan, 2005;
 Krapfen e misteri, PuzzleInk, Milan, 2009;
 La mano che cura, Marsilio, Venice, 2011;
 [https://www.marsilioeditori.it/libri/scheda-libro/3174456/lo-spettacolo-della-bellezza Lo spettacolo della bellezza], Marsilio, Venice, 2020;
Brenda & Henry: We'll Always Have Paris, Antiga Edizioni, Crocetta del Montello (Treviso), 2021.

References 

1951 births
Living people
Italian women journalists
21st-century Italian novelists
21st-century Italian women writers